Lange Peak is a peak,  high, in the west-central part of the Lyttelton Range in the Admiralty Mountains of Antarctica. It was mapped by the United States Geological Survey from surveys and U.S. Navy air photos, 1960–63, and was named by the Advisory Committee on Antarctic Names for United States Antarctic Research Program biologist Otto Ludwig Lange of Hallett Station, 1966–67.

References

Mountains of Victoria Land
Pennell Coast